DeepArt or DeepArt.io was a website that allowed users to create artistic images by using an algorithm to redraw one image using the stylistic elements of another image. with "A Neural Algorithm of Artistic Style" a Neural Style Transfer algorithm that was developed by several of its creators to separate style elements from a piece of art. The tool allows users to create imitation works of art using the style of various artists. The neural algorithm is used by the Deep Art website to create a representation of an image provided by the user by using the 'style' of another image provided by the user. A similar program, Prisma, is an iOS and Android app that was based on the open source programming that underlies DeepArt.

See also
 Computational creativity

References

External links 
Website

Algorithmic art
Deep learning software applications
Android (operating system) software
IOS software
2015 software